Born Sunday Adeniran Adedokun and known professionally as Niran Adedokun (born September 21, 1971) is a Nigerian writer and lawyer.

Career 
Adedokun, started his career as a journalist for local newspapers in Nigeria.

Adedokun is the author of many books including the book titled ‘Ladies calling the shots,’ published in 2017, a piece that looked into women’s contribution to the Nigerian film and entertainment business, which named many women including Tope Oshin, a Nigerian television and film director, producer. In 2019, he published a collection of some of his wide-ranging essays under the title ‘The Danfo Driver in All of Us.’ Following that was a publication of his anthology of fictional short stories the book titled ‘The Law is an Ass;’ and his recent book being ‘The Man, the Soldier, the Patriot: Biography of Lt. Gen. Ibrahim Attahiru,’ a biographical Adedokun published in 2022 about a notable Nigeria’s former Chief of Army Staff who died in an airplane crash.

Bibliography

References 

1971 births
Living people
21st-century Nigerian writers